Western Texas College (WTC) is a public community college in Snyder, Texas.  It was established in 1969 and has two downtown Snyder locations in addition to the main campus.  With an enrollment around 2,300, Western Texas College has an extensive distance learning department, provides dual-credit courses to 43 area high schools, and provides college-level coursework to inmates in three prisons in the West Texas area.
  
As defined by the Texas Legislature, the official Western Texas College service area encompasses Borden, Dickens, Fisher, Jones, Kent, Mitchell, Nolan, Runnels, Scurry, and Stonewall Counties.

Academics
Western Texas College offers the Associate of Arts (A.A.) degree, the Associate of Science (A.S.) degree, the Associate of Applied Science (A.A.S.) degree, and the Associate of Arts in Teaching (A.A.T.) degree.

Sports
Western Texas College is part of the Western Junior College Athletic Conference and the National Junior College Athletic Association Region 5. Competing athletic teams include: 
 Baseball
 Men's and women's basketball
 Cross country
 Men's and women's golf
 Rodeo
 Men's and women's soccer
 Softball
 Track and field
 Volleyball

Sports facilities

The WTC Coliseum
Western Texas College assumed ownership and operations of the Scurry County Coliseum in 2008. Renamed "The Coliseum", the 3,400-seat arena received a facelift thanks to a $500,000 donation from wind energy company, Invenergy. In addition to all college basketball home games played on Invenergy Court, The Coliseum is host to many annual events, including the West Texas Western Swing Festival held every year in June.

United Field
Home of the Lady Westerners softball team, United Field is also host to tournaments for high schools and colleges.

Westerner Field
Westerner Field is home to the Westerner baseball squad and local and regional baseball tournaments, including the annual Snyder High School tournament. The Westerners had their first winning season in the '10-'11 year, posting a 37-17 record.

Weaver Field Soccer Complex
Weaver Field, the WTC Soccer Complex, includes a full-sized regulation soccer pitch and three practice fields.  Plans include adding a 400-meter track to the complex.  In addition to home games for the WTC men's and women's soccer teams, the field hosts many local soccer events for Snyder schools.

WTC Campus Expansion
The WTC campus expanded by nearly 100 acres after Texas clothing and boot magnate James Cavender donated property adjacent to the campus.  This property currently houses the WTC Soccer Complex, Cavender Energy field lab, and a rugged outdoor cross country track used for local and regional cross country track events.

Notable alumni

J. D. Sheffield, physician and medical director in Gatesville and a Republican member of the Texas House of Representatives from Coryell County, began his higher education at WTC.

References

External links
 

Two-year colleges in the United States
Universities and colleges accredited by the Southern Association of Colleges and Schools
Education in Scurry County, Texas
Buildings and structures in Scurry County, Texas
Community colleges in Texas
NJCAA athletics